A Treasure's Trove: A Fairy Tale About Real Treasure for Parents and Children of All Ages is an illustrated children's book written by Michael Stadther and published in 2004 by Treasure Trove Inc, which he incorporated to do so.  The "real treasure" was found by deciphering clues in the book that led to fourteen tokens that could be turned in for unique jewels, each representing an insect or character from the book, or a cash prize representing one third of the jewel's value. Initially, it was reported that there were twelve jewels, however, it subsequently emerged that there were fourteen prizes. In 2005, it was reported that film rights for A Treasure's Trove had been acquired by Cruise/Wagner Productions, however, apart from a reported trailer being in development in the New York Times, there has been no further news.

Synopsis
The book is about twelve forest creatures whose mates disappear after being crystallized by a dark dust that falls every evening. The forest creatures combine forces with Zac (the handsome woodcarver), Ana (his beautiful half-elf, half-human wife), and their timid, chubby, winged "doth" Pook (inspired by the author's dog Misty) to save the creatures and restore the dying forest.

Treasure hunt
Inside the book are clues to fourteen tokens that were hidden in parks throughout the United States, which could be redeemed for jewels representing characters from the story. The unique jewels, which were collectively valued at one million dollars, have now all been found, and a book showing the solutions has been published.  Stadther subsequently published another book with a new treasure hunt, Secrets of the Alchemist Dar.

Three of the Treasure's Trove jewels were original pieces, including a 19th-century Russian grasshopper, a snail and a ladybug. Another jewel, representing the villain Rusful, was an uncut black diamond.  The rest of the jewels were made by Robert Q. Underhill of Jewelry Designs in Danbury, Connecticut. He was commissioned after Stadther noticed a hummingbird brooch in his shop while looking for a gift for his wife.

They are as follows:

The Treasure's Trove Jewels were exhibited at the Carnegie Museum in 2004.

References

American picture books
2004 children's books
Puzzle hunts
Puzzle books